Raúl González Gutiérrez (born 8 January 1970) is a Spanish retired handball player who competed in the 1996 Summer Olympics and current coach of Paris Saint-Germain.

Biography
In 1996 he was a member of the Spanish handball team which won the bronze medal. He played six matches and scored five goals. After his career in late 2005 was Raúl González assistant coach of Talant Duyshebaev at BM Ciudad Real and his successor BM Atlético Madrid. Following the withdrawal of Madrid in the summer of 2013. He was without a club. In January 2014 he took over as coach at the Macedonian club RK Vardar. With Vardar he won the 2016–2017 EHF Champions League as a head coach, 2016–2017 SEHA League and many domestic league and cup titles. In the 2013–14 EHF Champions League he turned in the second round to defending champion HSV Hamburg made, before he lost in the quarterfinals of the SG Flensburg-Handewitt due to the away goals rule.

Honours

RK Vardar
Manager
Macedonian League: 2014–15, 2015–16, 2016–17 and 2017–2018
Macedonian Cup: 2014, 2015, 2016, 2017 and 2018
SEHA League: 2013–14, 2016–17 and 2017–18
EHF Champions League: 2016–17

Individual awards
 French Championship Best Coach: 2020

References

External links

1970 births
Living people
Spanish male handball players
Olympic handball players of Spain
Handball players at the 1996 Summer Olympics
Olympic bronze medalists for Spain
BM Valladolid players
Liga ASOBAL players
Olympic medalists in handball
Medalists at the 1996 Summer Olympics
Sportspeople from Valladolid
Spanish expatriate sportspeople in France
Spanish expatriate sportspeople in North Macedonia
Handball coaches of international teams
20th-century Spanish people
21st-century Spanish people